The 2005 World Single Distance Speed Skating Championships were held between 3 and 6 March 2005 in the Ludwig-Schwabl-Stadion, Inzell, Germany.

Schedule

Medal summary

Men's events

Women's events

Medal table

Multiple medallists

External links
 ISU Results

2005 World Single Distance
World Single Distance Speed Skating Championships
World Single Distance, 2005
2005 in German sport
Sports competitions in Bavaria
2005 in Bavaria
World Single Distance Speed Skating Championships